Apostolic Church may refer to:

 In the history of Christianity, the church of the Apostolic Age (1st century AD)
 Any apostolic see, being any episcopal see whose foundation is attributed to one or more of the apostles of Jesus
 Armenian Apostolic Church, the Oriental Orthodox national church of Armenia
 Apostolic Christian Church, worldwide Christian denomination in the Anabaptist tradition
 Apostolic Christian Church of America
 Apostolic Christian Church (Nazarene)
 Catholic Apostolic Church, formed in 1835, the church movement associated with Edward Irving
 Old Apostolic Church, Christian faith community with roots in the Catholic Apostolic Church
 Reformed Old Apostolic Church
 New Apostolic Church, formed in 1863, a chiliastic Christian church that split from the Catholic Apostolic Church during an 1863 schism in Hamburg, Germany
 United Apostolic Church, independent communities in the tradition of the catholic apostolic revival movement which started at the beginning of the 19th century in England and Scotland. The church also includes:
 Apostolic Church of Queensland 
 Apostolic Church of South Africa – Apostle Unity
Several Pentecostal denominations:
 Apostolic Faith Church
 Apostolic Church (1916 denomination), formed in Wales
 Apostolic Church Nigeria, a group part of the abovementioned denomination 
 Apostolic Church (Czechoslovakia), a Pentecostal denomination now divided into:
 Apostolic Church (Czech Republic)
 Apostolic Church (Slovakia)
 Apostolic Assembly of the Faith in Christ Jesus
 Apostolic Church of Johane Maranke

See also
Catholic Apostolic Church (disambiguation)
Apostle (disambiguation)